Fretzie Bercede (born November 26, 1993) is a Filipina actress, television personality, and former reality show contestant. She ranked as the 3rd big placer of Pinoy Big Brother: Teen Clash 2010. She is one of ABS-CBN's contract talents.

Personal life
Fretzie Joans Bercede was born in Cebu City to a Filipino-American mother, a businesswoman and former beauty queen; and a Filipino-Chinese father, a Doctor of Dental Medicine and Orthodontics/Dentofacial Orthopedics.
Fretzie grew up in the Philippines. She celebrates her birthday every 26 November and was born in the year 1993. Her religion is Seventh-day Adventist.

She is both talented and athletic. She's been raised the conservative way and is very close with her family.

Television and Acting Career

Television
Fretzie Bercede was dubbed as “Charming Angel ng Cebu” of the Philippine reality TV show in ABS-CBN Pinoy Big Brother: Teen Clash 2010.
Fretzie was voted and proclaimed the Third Teen Big Placer in Pinoy Big Brother: Teen Clash 2010.
Pinoy Big Brother: Teen Clash 2010 began airing on April 10, 2010 till two months later on June 26 of the same year. The show lasted for 78 days, surpassing the second Teen edition for the longest Teen Edition by only one day. 

Fretzie was cast in ABS-CBN, Shoutout!, a teen music reality variety show and later called Shoutout: Level Up! on Abs-Cbn.
She was part of Miyerkulitz group on Shoutout! 
The show premiered November 29, 2010, and is hosted by the network's leading stars that include Erich Gonzales, Enchong Dee, Robi Domingo, Sam Concepcion and Enrique Gil. The show runs for 45 minutes, as the afternoon program. In the first week of December, ShoutOut was moved to an earlier time, with a longer airing time of 1 hour.
The first season ran for eight weeks from November 29, 2010 to January 21, 2011. In the first six weeks, it was shown as a pre-program for the Primetime Bida block for forty-five minutes. Aside from performances, Shoutout! also featured different segments, including games involving audience members and a segment featuring fan arts. 

Fretzie starred in 2 episodes of Maynila, a Filipino drama anthology that has been broadcast on Philippine television.

Fretzie reveals herself as a model as she walks in for the Jellybean fashion Show in Philippine Fashion Week at MOA on October 29, 2010.

Fretzie modeled on the catwalk in Folded & Hung’s biggest event of the year — the 2010 Streetcast Fashion Show held at SMX Center in Pasay

Fretzie was invited to walk for Candie’s in Philippine Fashion Week as a modern-day princess as one of their 'celebrity guests' in a conceptual fashion show in the day of May 14, 2011 at the Mall of Asia. Currently, Vanessa Hudgens fronts the campaign. The brand’s love for youthful individuality is mirrored in their endorsers, previous Candie’s girls include: Fergie of The Black Eyed Peas, Hilary Duff, Ashlee Simpson, Kelly Clarkson and Britney Spears.

Fretzie together with Ann Li were featured in James Reid and Bret Jackson's original song "Can't Dance" released under Star Records. They launched their first digital album entitled We Are Whatever on ASAP Rocks.

Stage play
Fretzie starred in a Stage Play. She plays the role of Juliet, the leading lady. Portraying Romeo is her fellow PBB Teen Clash of 2010.
Romeo and Juliet, written by William Shakespeare is one of Shakespear’s most popular and performed plays.

The production performs in Cinema 5 of SM Sta. Mesa, Manila and other cities as part of a nationwide provincial tour that sums up to more than 80 performances.

Filmography

Television

Reality Shows

Drama Shows

Talk Shows

Variety Shows

Theatre/Stage Play

References

External links 

Fretzie Bercede profile at Star Magic Website.

1993 births
Living people
Filipino television actresses
Pinoy Big Brother contestants
Star Magic
Filipino Seventh-day Adventists
Filipino people of Chinese descent
Filipino people of American descent
Actresses from Cebu